Leucophleps is a genus of truffle-like fungi in the family Albatrellaceae. The genus, widespread in northern temperate regions, contains four species. Leucophleps was circumscribed by American mycologist Harvey Willson Harkness in 1899.

References

Russulales
Russulales genera